Zeferino dos Prazeres is a São Toméan politician. He was President of the Regional Government of Príncipe from 12 April 2002 to 20 June 2006. He is a member of the Movement for the Liberation of São Tomé e Príncipe-Democratic Socialist Party and was born in 1960.

References

Living people
1960 births
People from Príncipe
Movement for the Liberation of São Tomé and Príncipe/Social Democratic Party politicians
21st-century São Tomé and Príncipe politicians